Baptiste Faye (born 18 August 1986) is a Senegalese  footballer who is playing as a centre forward for KT Rovers in the Malaysia M3 League.

References

External

1987 births
Living people
Senegalese footballers
Senegalese expatriate sportspeople in Albania
Expatriate footballers in Albania
Association football forwards
Luftëtari Gjirokastër players
Kategoria Superiore players
F.C. Oliveira do Hospital players
Sportspeople from Thiès